Pittsford Village Historic District is a national historic district located at the village of Pittsford in Monroe County, New York. The district encompasses 198 contributing elements on 107 properties.  The district excludes the central business district.  It includes 120 contributing dwellings, three churches, two schools and contributing outbuildings dating from the 1810s to 1930s.

It was listed on the National Register of Historic Places in 1984. In 2016 it was greatly expanded, including almost the entire village.

See also

National Register of Historic Places listings in Monroe County, New York

References

Historic districts on the National Register of Historic Places in New York (state)
Georgian architecture in New York (state)
Federal architecture in New York (state)
Historic districts in Monroe County, New York
National Register of Historic Places in Monroe County, New York